Ron Derrick (born 17 February 1933) is a former Australian rules footballer who played with St Kilda in the Victorian Football League (VFL).

Notes

External links 

Living people
1933 births
Australian rules footballers from Victoria (Australia)
St Kilda Football Club players